The Hunza–Nagar District is a former district of Gilgit–Baltistan in Pakistan. In July 2015, the district was divided into two separate districts, namely Hunza District and Nagar District.

Education 

According to the Alif Ailaan Pakistan District Education Rankings 2015, Hunza-Nagar is ranked 21 out of 148 districts in terms of education. For facilities and infrastructure, the district is ranked 58 out of 148.

See also 

 Naltar Valley
 Hunza Valley
 Karakoram Highway
 Gilgit

References

External links 

Districts of Gilgit-Baltistan
 
Former subdivisions of Pakistan